Ainthu Sahoo (1 January 1928 – 28 November 2013) was an Indian politician. He represented Bolangir loksabha constituency in 6th Loksabha.

Early life
Ainthu Sahoo was born to Bhagwan Sahoo at Batharla village of Bolangir District in Odisha. He studied in the Rajendra College bolangir and the Madhusudan Law College in Cuttack.

Political career
He was elected to Odisha state assembly from Patnagarh assembly constituency 3 times. He also represented Bolangir Loksabha constituency in 6th Loksabha as member of swatantra party. He chaired of Western Odisha Development Council.

Notes

People from Balangir district
People from Odisha
India MPs 1977–1979
1928 births
2013 deaths
Swatantra Party politicians
Janata Party politicians